Tony Tarzell Yarber (born April 16, 1978) is an American pastor, educator and politician in Jackson, Mississippi. He was elected as Mayor of Jackson in April 2014 from special election following the death in office of Chokwe Lumumba. A native of Jackson and experienced city councilor, Yarber is noted for his passion for youth causes, and has been described as "a consensus builder". He was succeeded as Mayor of Jackson by his predecessor's son Chokwe Antar Lumumba on July 3, 2017.

Career and personal life
Yarber was born in Jackson, Mississippi to George and Deloris Yarber in 1978, and grew up in the city's Westside Community. He attended Forest Hill High School in Jackson.

Yarber received a B.S. in Elementary Education from the University of Southern Mississippi and an M.S. in Education Administration and Supervision from Jackson State University. He has taught school and served as an elementary school principal. Yarber served as a committee member for the Southern Association of Colleges and Schools.

He is also Pastor and Founder of the non-denominational Relevant Empowerment Church, started in 2008. He has served on the Board of Directors for Relevant Ministries.

Yarber has a black belt in ninjutsu. He is married and has three children.

In August 2016, a lawsuit was filed by Yarber's former executive assistant Kimberly Bracey, who accused Yarber of firing her when she turned down his sexual advances. Yarber denied the allegations.

Civic achievements
Yarber is a founding member of Alignment Jackson, a non-profit organization for improving student achievement.

He was the second Vice-President of the Mississippi Black Caucus of Locally Elected Officials.

Elected office

City Councillor
In 2009, Yarber entered city politics, running for the Jackson City Council from Ward 6. He became City Council Vice President in 2011, and President in 2012. In 2013, Yarber served as Chair of the Budget Committee and the Education/Youth Ad Hoc Committee.

Mayor
Yarber was elected Mayor of Jackson on April 22, 2014, in a runoff election against Chokwe Antar Lumumba, son of deceased former mayor Chokwe Lumumba.

Yarber stated that his goals as mayor would be to improve customer service for residents and to attract new business. Yarber also discussed Jackson's potential for growth as an entertainment hub, and as a "medical corridor."

On May 2, 2017, Yarber was soundly defeated by Chokwe Antar Lumumba in the nine-candidate primary for the Democratic nominee for mayor of Jackson, receiving 5% to Lumumba's 55%.

References

External links
Office of the Mayor

1978 births
African-American mayors in Mississippi
Mississippi Democrats
University of Southern Mississippi alumni
Jackson State University alumni
Living people
Mississippi city council members
Mayors of Jackson, Mississippi
21st-century American politicians
21st-century African-American politicians
20th-century African-American people